Francisco Javier Oliver (born 30 May 1995) is an Argentine professional footballer who plays as a centre-back for Club Atletico Belgrano.

Career
Oliver's career started with Atlético de Rafaela, prior to him joining Torneo Federal A side Libertad. His debut came during a draw with Sportivo Las Parejas on 7 February 2016, which was the first of sixteen further appearances in 2016. In the following July, Oliver joined San Martín of Primera B Nacional. Twenty-two appearances subsequently arrived across two seasons, though just two during 2017–18 which San Martín ended with promotion to the Argentine Primera División. Oliver remained in the second tier, completing a move to Santamarina on 30 June 2018. He made his bow on 25 August as the club were defeated by Agropecuario.

Career statistics
.

References

External links

1995 births
Living people
Footballers from Santa Fe, Argentina
Argentine footballers
Association football defenders
Torneo Federal A players
Primera Nacional players
Libertad de Sunchales footballers
San Martín de Tucumán footballers
Club y Biblioteca Ramón Santamarina footballers
Deportivo Morón footballers
Club Atlético Sarmiento footballers
Club Atlético Tigre footballers
Club Atlético Belgrano footballers